Raimon Casellas i Dou (Barcelona, January 7, 1855 - Sant Joan de les Abadesses, November 2, 1910) was a Catalan journalist, art critic, modernisme narrator and collector. Author of Els sots feréstecs (1901), a work considered the first modernist novel in Catalan language and a forerunner of the current known as rural naturalism. Els sots feréstecs was translated to English by Alan Yates and published by Dedalus.

He also wrote articles about aestethics and Art critics for magazines like L'Avenç, La Vanguardia, L'Esquella de la Torratxa and Cucut!. In 1899 he became the Chief Editor of the newspaper La Veu de Catalunya, and his articles greatly influenced the Catalan artists of his time.

Els sots feréstecs, published in 1901 tells the story of father Llàtzer, a city bishop who is exiled to a rural parish for doctrinal heresy, and the upset that his arrival causes among the inhabitants of Sant Pau de Montmany. The premise of the story is a metaphor for the failure of the intellectual modernist movement to transform society.

Casellas was also an art collector. His collection is now preserved at Museu Nacional d'Art de Catalunya. It includes more than 4000 drawings and nearly 400 engravings representing the work of 250 artists.

Works

Narrative 

 Els sots feréstecs, 1901(Dark Vales [Els sots feréstecs]. Sawtry: Dedalus Books, 2014. (Trad. Alan Yates)
 Les multituds, 1906
 Llibre d'històries, 1909
 La damisel·la santa, 1918
 Deu-nos aigua, Majestat! (1898)

Essay 

 El dibuixant païsista Lluís Rigalt, 1900.
 Etapes estètiques I, 1916. Societat Catalana d'Edicions.
 Etapes estètiques II, 1918. Societat Catalana d'Edicions.

As a historian 

 La pintura gòtica catalana del segle XV 
 Història documental de la pintura catalana (1008-1799)

References 

Writers from Barcelona
Modernisme writers
1855 births
1910 deaths